Crossotarsus saundersi, commonly known as stem borer, is a species of weevil found in Sri Lanka, Australia and New Zealand.

Description
It is a common beetle abundantly during the autumn and the spring. They are known as pinhole borers where they attack freshly felled tree trunks. Beetles are abundant in regions of moderate rainfall and in wet zones.

References 

Curculionidae
Insects of Sri Lanka
Beetles described in 1865